Andoni Lakabeg Fraile (born 14 February 1969) is a Spanish retired footballer who played as a right back.

Football career
Born in Bilbao, Biscay, Lakabeg was only 19 when he was promoted to Athletic Bilbao's first team, as English Howard Kendall was in charge. He appeared in 35 matches in his first season to help the Basque club finish in seventh position, his La Liga debut coming on 3 September 1988 in a 3–0 home win against Sevilla FC.

After two years as a highly utilized reserve, Lakabeg again gained starter status under Jupp Heynckes, but eventually lost his importance to Iñigo Larrainzar, signed from CA Osasuna in 1994 and a future Spanish international. In January 1996 he signed with Celta de Vigo, but made all his appearances in his first season, after which he was pushed to the sidelines by another future international, Míchel Salgado; in another winter transfer move, in 1998, he joined Villarreal CF, appearing regularly in his five-month spell as the Valencian Community side achieved a first-ever top level promotion.

Leaving Villarreal immediately after that achievement, Lakabeg resumed his career in various levels of Spanish football: the third (with CE Sabadell FC, until 2001), the fourth (until 2006) and the Basque regional leagues, eventually calling it quits at 40. During his extensive career, he appeared in 202 Spanish top division matches.

References

External links

Celta de Vigo biography 

1969 births
Living people
Spanish footballers
Footballers from Bilbao
Association football defenders
La Liga players
Segunda División players
Segunda División B players
Tercera División players
Bilbao Athletic footballers
Athletic Bilbao footballers
RC Celta de Vigo players
Villarreal CF players
CE Sabadell FC footballers
SD Indautxu footballers
SD Leioa players
Basque Country international footballers